Ralph Edgar Sheffield (born January 11, 1955) is an American politician. He was a Republican member for the 55th district of the Texas House of Representatives from 2010 to 2015.

Sheffield was born in Waco, Texas. He attended Richfield High School, graduating in 1973. Whithin two years he had established his first restaurant. Sheffield is the owner of the Las Casas Restaurant and All Occasion Catering. In 2008 he was elected for the 55th district of the Texas House of Representatives. In 2014 he was defeated in the Republican primary for the 55th district by Molly White, who succeeded him as representative in 2015.

References 

1955 births
Living people
People from Waco, Texas
Republican Party members of the Texas House of Representatives
21st-century American politicians
American restaurateurs